The following is a list of ecoregions in Somalia, as identified by the Worldwide Fund for Nature (WWF).

Terrestrial ecoregions
by major habitat type

Tropical and subtropical moist broadleaf forests

 Ethiopian montane forests
 Northern Zanzibar–Inhambane coastal forest mosaic

Tropical and subtropical grasslands, savannas, and shrublands

 Somali Acacia–Commiphora bushlands and thickets

Deserts and xeric shrublands

 Ethiopian xeric grasslands and shrublands
 Hobyo grasslands and shrublands
 Somali montane xeric woodlands

Mangroves
East African mangroves

References
 Burgess, Neil, Jennifer D’Amico Hales, Emma Underwood (2004). Terrestrial Ecoregions of Africa and Madagascar: A Conservation Assessment. Island Press, Washington DC.
 Thieme, Michelle L. (2005). Freshwater Ecoregions of Africa and Madagascar: A Conservation Assessment. Island Press, Washington DC.

 
Ecoregions
Somalia